The men's tanding 60 kilograms competition at the 2018 Asian Games took place from 23 to 29 August 2018 at Padepokan Pencak Silat, Taman Mini Indonesia Indah, Jakarta, Indonesia.

Pencak silat is traditional Indonesian martial arts. Pencak silat is assessed from a punch, kick, sweep, and dings. The target that must be addressed is the patron in the body of every fighter who competed. Each judge gives an individual score for each competitor. The score given to each boxer would be taken from all 5 judges.

A total of nine competitors from nine different countries competed in this Class C event, limited to fighters whose body weight was less than 60 kilograms.

Hanifan Yudani Kusumah from Indonesia won the gold medal after defeating Nguyễn Thái Linh from Vietnam in the gold medal match by the score of 3–2. Adilan Chemaeng from Thailand and Mohd Hazim Amzad from Malaysia finished third and won the bronze medal after losing in the semifinal.

Schedule
All times are Western Indonesia Time (UTC+07:00)

Results

References

External links
Official website

Men's tanding 60 kg